Snout Spout is a fictional character in the popular Masters of the Universe franchise. He is a cyborg with a human body and a metal elephant head. He serves the Heroic Warriors as a firefighter, his main power being to spray jets of water, stored in a special pack on his back, from his trunk, which he refills periodically from rivers and lakes.

Character history

Cartoon
Snout Spout was introduced into the Masters of the Universe toy line in 1986. By the time his action figure was released, the accompanying cartoon series, He-Man and the Masters of the Universe had been cancelled to make way for its spin-off series, She-Ra: Princess of Power. Therefore, Snout Spout makes his cartoon appearances in She-Ra rather than He-Man.

Appearing in 3 episodes: "Small Problems", "Out of the Cocoon" and "Day of the Flowers", Snout Spout's roles are little more than cameos and he receives no real character development. Several continuity discrepancies also surround his character, as in his first episode he is referred to as "Hose Nose", this being Mattel's working name for the character, yet "Day of the Flowers" refers to him as Snout Spout with no explanation for the name change. His first two appearances also seem to indicate he lives on Etheria, yet the latter episode ties him in with Mattel's continuity by depicting him as He-Man's friend, visiting from Eternia.

He also made a cameo in the He-Man & She-Ra Christmas Special, shown extending his snout to place the star on the tree.

2002 series
Snout Spout is never shown in the 200X cartoon series but Eternian firemen are shown in the accompanying comic series dressed like Snout Spout, the line was canceled before his figure could be released. In 2004, a mini statue of the character was produced by NECA.

Masters of the Universe Classics
In the Masters of the Universe Classics toyline, Jaxton was an Etherian peasant who was one of three gladiators captured by Hordak and thrown into the experimental matrix which grafted cybernetic parts to him. The other two were Dragstor and Extendar. He later escaped to Eternia and sided with He-Man.

Other media
Although the cartoon offers no kind of consistency to Snout Spout's character, other media producing Masters of the Universe stories throughout the 1980s give the character more exposure, as well as a background story. A Mattel promotional card states that he was formerly an Etherian peasant who was captured by Hordak and subjected to fiendish experiments which turned him into the elephantine cyborg he is today. Although initially intended to serve The Evil Horde, he managed to throw off Hordak's brainwashing attempt and escape to Eternia, where he joined He-Man and the Heroic Warriors.

This backstory was adopted by the UK comic series published by London Editions, which introduces Snout Spout in a story entitled "The Unknown Warrior", in which he makes his way from Etheria to Eternia wearing a mask, refusing to remove his mask or reveal his identity until he has proved himself a worthy hero. He is presented in the comic series as insecure and paranoid about his appearance, yet never overly self-pitiful and determined to fight on against the Horde until he finds some way of returning to his human form.

In the Star Comics series, he only had one major appearance, in issue #4, Snakes Alive. Here, he was shown as being in a constant, not-so-friendly rivalry with Rio Blast, with both characters constantly trying to belittle and outdo each other.

Reception
Snout Spout was voted No.5 in The 14 Least Masterful Masters of the Universe by Io9. Snout Spout was voted No.3 of 8 Crazy Masters of the Universe Figures. Comic Book Resources voted Snout Spout 13th Most Useless He-Man Characters To Ever Appear On-Screen.

Snout Spout was voted 5th out 7 in the 7 Stupidest He-Man Characters by Total Film.

References

Fictional androids
Fictional cyborgs
Fictional firefighters
Male characters in animated series
Masters of the Universe Heroic Warriors
Television characters introduced in 1985